Andhra Prabha - Journalism first is a Telugu language daily newspaper of India sold mostly in the states of Andhra Pradesh and Telangana. The newspaper is one of the oldest running Telugu-language daily newspapers of India. The newspaper and website (www.prabhanews.com) were owned by the New Indian Express Group of Companies but the newspaper was sold to entrepreneurs from Kakinada, Andhra Pradesh. The newspaper is owned by Mootha Gopalakrishna (spelled as "Muttha Gopalakrishna"), former M.L.A of Kakinada city (Assembly Constituency). The newspaper publishes neutral news not in support of any political organisation and is the one of the most balanced and close-to-reality Telugu language daily newspapers.

Early history
Andhra Prabha was started in Madras (now, Chennai) on August 15, 1938 by Ramnath Goenka under his Indian Express group and published from major towns inside Andhra Pradesh from the 1950s to challenge the prominence of the then leading Telugu newspaper, Andhra Patrika. In 1960, Andhra Prabha's circulation was 53,000 for its two editions from Vijayawada and Chittoor. Ten years later, then publishing from Vijayawada and Bangalore circulation reached 1,16,000, vastly surpassing that of Andhra Patrika.

A reader from Ballari originally suggested the name "Andhra Prabha" and the management of the newspaper awarded him with the sum of ₹116 as a token of their gratitude. The paper was initially edited by Khasa Subba Rao (joint editor of Indian Express) who was succeeded by Nyayapati Narayana Murthy. In 1942, Narla Venkateswara Rao was promoted from news-editor to editor of the paper. He held this position for seventeen years, a period of time that is considered epochal in Telugu journalism. He was responsible for many revolutionary changes in headline and caption writing, in the framing of action photos, in news display and in page make-up. It was during Narla's editorship that the paper was closed down for a brief period during the Quit India Movement. The newspaper was shut down for a few months in order to protest the British Government's attempt to impose censorship on the press. The Andhra Prabha was also banned from the State of Mysore and the State of Hyderabad because it opposed the feudal nature of these regimes. Narla later tendered his resignation when he had a falling out with Ramnath Goenka over his sympathy with the workers in the press which resulted in a strike in Chennai. He was succeeded by Neelamraju Venkataseshaiah. Venkataseshaiah was succeeded by Panditharadhyula Nageswara Rao, from 1969–1976.

In July 2018, it entered into broadcasting space by launching a nationwide English news channel named "India Ahead". It became the first English News Channel to be beamed out of South India.

Editions

Currently there are editions of Andhra Prabha in Bangalore, Hyderabad, Chennai, Visakhapatnam and Vijayawada. Until 1959, Andhra Prabha was published only from Chennai. In 1960, anticipating the impending launch of Andhra Jyothy, Andhra Prabha launched its second edition from Vijayawada. A Chittoor edition was brought out briefly in the early 1960s which was shifted to Bangalore in 1966. A Hyderabad edition was launched in 1977 and, in 1985, to counter the launch of Eenadu, an edition was launched in Visakhapatnam.

Features and supplements

The paper carries the following features regularly - Muhurtam, Graha Balam, Kreeda Prabha, Aurah!, Nayika and Chintana.

Supplements include:
Monday : Sahiti Gavaksham, Chintana, Life
Tuesday : Kulasa, Chintana
Wednesday: Yuva, Chintana
Thursday : Chitraprabha
Friday : Sirigamulu
Saturday : Bala Prabha (Entertainment and Knowledge for kids), Chintana
Sunday : A 32 Page Mini Weekly

References

External links
Official Website
Andhra Prabha ePaper

Telugu-language newspapers
Daily newspapers published in India
Mass media in Andhra Pradesh
Indian Express Limited
1938 establishments in India
Newspapers published in Vijayawada
Newspapers published in Hyderabad